Apisai Driu Baibai (born 18 November 1970) is a Fijian sprinter. He competed in the men's 200 metres at the 1992 Summer Olympics.

References

1970 births
Living people
Athletes (track and field) at the 1992 Summer Olympics
Fijian male sprinters
Olympic athletes of Fiji
Place of birth missing (living people)